John Graham Mountford (21 November 1933 – 17 June 2022) was an Australian politician. Born in Sydney, he was a public servant and manager before becoming Mayor of Canterbury Municipal Council in 1977. In 1980 he defeated sitting member Vince Martin for Labor preselection for the seat of Banks in the Australian House of Representatives, which he won, holding the seat until his retirement in 1990.

References

Carr, Adam (2008). Psephos - Adam Carr's Election Archive, Australian Election Archive

1933 births
2022 deaths
Australian Labor Party members of the Parliament of Australia
Members of the Australian House of Representatives for Banks
Members of the Australian House of Representatives
20th-century Australian politicians
Mayors of Canterbury, New South Wales